223 Main Street is a historic commercial building located in downtown Evansville, Indiana. It was built in 1910, and is a three-story, Art Nouveau style building.

It was listed on the National Register of Historic Places in 1982.

References

Commercial buildings on the National Register of Historic Places in Indiana
Art Nouveau architecture in Indiana
Commercial buildings completed in 1910
Buildings and structures in Evansville, Indiana
National Register of Historic Places in Evansville, Indiana